Blythewood is a historic house in Columbia, Maury County, Tennessee, USA.

History
The house was built in the Antebellum Era for Thomas Keesee, a carriage maker. Completed , the house is in the French Colonial style, unusual for this part of Tennessee.

During the American Civil War of 1861–1865, it belonged to the Wilson family. It was later acquired by Colonel P. C. Bethell, followed by Colonel R. E. Rivers, and finally by Colonel E. H. Hatcher.

Heritage significance
It has been listed on the National Register of Historic Places since April 11, 1973.

References

Houses on the National Register of Historic Places in Tennessee
Houses in Columbia, Tennessee
National Register of Historic Places in Maury County, Tennessee